Two human polls and a committee's selections comprise the 2015 National Collegiate Athletic Association (NCAA) Division III football rankings. Unlike in Division I's Football Bowl Subdivision (FBS), the NCAA, Division III's college football's governing body, bestows a national championship on the winner of the Stagg Bowl – the championship round of a 32-team postseason tournament. The main weekly poll that begins in the preseason is the D3Football.com Poll which ranks the top 25 colleges in Division III football. Another weekly poll starting in the preseason is the BennetRank. One additional poll is released midway through the season, the AFCA Division III Coaches' Poll.

Legend

D3Football.com Poll

AFCA Coaches Poll

References

Rankings
NCAA Division III football rankings